Hala Urania is an indoor arena in Olsztyn, Poland.

The Urania hall was commissioned in July 1978. The hall has a large sports hall with a full-size playground for handball, football, basketball, volleyball, floorball, tennis, badminton, indoor football, a small specialist hall for martial arts, corrective gymnastics and a gym.
At Urania local men's volleyball club Indykpol AZS Olsztyn has played its matches as a hosts.

References

Indoor arenas in Poland
Sports venues in Warmian-Masurian Voivodeship
Volleyball venues in Poland